The M18 motorway is an inter-urban motorway in Ireland, forming part of the  Limerick, Ennis to Galway national primary road, which, in turn, forms part of the Atlantic Corridor called for as part of the Transport 21 project.

Route
The motorway starts at junction 9 on the Shannon bypass and heads in a northerly direction where it bypasses the town of Newmarket-on-Fergus via the townlands of Killulla, Knocksaggart and Ballyconneely. After Newmarket-on-Fergus the motorway runs alongside Dromoland, where significant historical features can be seen from the mainline.

As the route gets further north it develops into a more modern style of road: the Ennis Bypass. The median was constructed with a H2 concrete barrier rather than the wide grassy median seen in the earlier stretch to the south and features a lower noise wearing course. Bypassing the notorious bottlenecks of Ennis town and Clarecastle village, this section was completed in 2007 and significantly reduces travel times between Galway, Ennis, and Limerick. After passing to the east of Ennis the motorway enters the townlands of Killow and Knockanean.

A 22 km stretch, bypassing Crusheen village and the town of Gort, was opened in November 2010. The motorway ends at junction 18 of the M6, following its completion in September 2017. The road continues northbound as the M17 towards Tuam.

History
Ennis Bypass (January 2007, as dual carriageway, redesignated as a Motorway)
Newmarket-on-Fergus Bypass (December 2002, as dual carriageway)
Crusheen to Gort (November 2010, Motorway)
Gort to M6/M17 Junction 18 (September 2017, Motorway)

Ennis Bypass
The  Ennis Bypass opened to traffic as a standard dual carriageway section of the N18 on 26 January 2007, after a construction period of almost three years. It was redesignated as a Motorway on the 28th of August 2009  In addition to Ennis, the road also bypasses the village of Clarecastle. The scheme was built by Gama Strabeg JV.

Newmarket-on-Fergus Bypass
The Newmarket-on-Fergus Bypass opened as a  dual carriageway on 30 September 2002, routing around the town of Newmarket-on-Fergus. The scheme alleviated one of the worst congestion black spots in the country. It includes two grade separated junctions at Carrigoran and Dromoland. It was redesignated as motorway on 28 August 2009.

Ennis (Crusheen) to Gort
Construction of a  section of the M18 between Crusheen and Gort commenced in October, 2008 and was opened to traffic on 12 November 2010. This scheme, known as 'Gort to Crusheen', connects to the northern end of the Ennis bypass and provides continuous motorway to just north of Gort in County Galway. The scheme was built by SIAC Wills JV.

Gort to Claregalway
The Gort to Tuam (M18/M17) route is 58 km (36 mi.) long. It connects to the M17 Motorway where they cross the Dublin to Galway M6 motorway, which opened in December 2009. This was also included in the second tranche of motorway redesignations and was opened as motorway. In April 2014, it was confirmed that it would proceed. Work on the project began on 15 January 2015 and was managed by Direct Route. It was officially opened on 27 September 2017.

Motorway redesignations affecting the M18
Initially, none of the proposed dual carriageway between Limerick and Galway outlined in the Transport 21 programme was to operate under motorway restrictions. However, the National Roads Authority (NRA) decided late in 2008 to include all sections of grade separated N18 – whether built, under construction, or still at the planning stage – in its second tranche of motorway redesignation proposals.  These were approved by the Minister for Transport in July 2009, and the changes came into effect on 28 August 2009.

Junctions

References

Motorways in the Republic of Ireland
Roads in County Clare
Roads in County Galway